Cotachena is a genus of moths of the family Crambidae.

Species
Cotachena aluensis Butler, 1887
Cotachena alysoni Whalley, 1961
Cotachena brunnealis Yamanaka, 2001
Cotachena fuscimarginalis Hampson, 1916
Cotachena heteromima Meyrick, 1889
Cotachena hicana (Turner, 1915)
Cotachena histricalis (Walker, 1859)
Cotachena nepalensis Yamanaka, 2000
Cotachena pubescens Warren, 1892
Cotachena taiwanalis Yamanaka, 2001

Former species
Cotachena octoguttalis (Felder & Rogenhofer, 1875)
Cotachena smaragdina (Butler, 1875)

References

Spilomelinae
Crambidae genera
Taxa named by Frederic Moore